Jorge Antonio Bell Mathey (born October 21, 1959), better known as George Bell, is a Dominican former left fielder and American League MVP in Major League Baseball who played 12 seasons for the Toronto Blue Jays (1981, 1983–1990), Chicago Cubs (1991) and Chicago White Sox (1992–1993). Bell batted and threw right-handed.

Career

Originally signed by the Philadelphia Phillies in 1978, Bell was selected by the Toronto Blue Jays in the 1980 Rule 5 draft. Bell was discovered in the Dominican Republic by Blue Jays scout Epy Guerrero. Bell caught a fly ball, off the bat of Ron Hassey, for the final out in the 5–1 victory over the New York Yankees on October 5, clinching the division title for the Blue Jays. Despite Bell's .321 average in the ALCS, they lost the series to the Kansas City Royals. Bell finished with a .308 batting average, .352 on-base percentage, .608 slugging percentage, 111 runs, 47 home runs and a league-leading 134 runs batted in. He was awarded the American League MVP award that year.

On April 4, Bell became the first player in Major League history to hit three home runs on an opening day (all of them coming off of Bret Saberhagen), however, his play throughout the year declined as he conflicted with Blue Jays manager Jimy Williams, who wanted Bell to become the Jays' full-time designated hitter. However, in the ALCS, he only hit .200 with one home run, as they lost the series to the Oakland Athletics. 

Bell became a free agent after the  season and signed with the Chicago Cubs. After one year with the Cubs, he was traded across town to the Chicago White Sox for Sammy Sosa and Ken Patterson. In  his play declined, primarily due to a persistent knee injury. He was benched in the ALCS against his former team, the Blue Jays, and was released at the end of the season, after which he announced his retirement.

Bell was a powerful free-swinger, usually posting a good slugging percentage and relatively low strikeout rate, but a poor on-base percentage. He was known as a mediocre defensive player and played mainly as a designated hitter during the last two years of his career, despite his strong preference for playing in the field. Despite his success on the field, Bell had a love-hate relationship with the fans and media in Toronto, particularly in his later years as his declining defensive game came to overshadow his offensive talents. After the fans booed him for committing an error, he told the media that the fans could "kiss my purple butt." The next day a sign appeared in left field "George, we are behind you all the way."  Bell's difficult relationship with the Toronto sports media was exacerbated by his reluctance to do interviews during his early years with the Blue Jays (which was due to his then-weak knowledge with the English language). Towards the end of his time in Toronto, however, Bell warmed to the media, who in turn began to soften their often harsh criticisms of his play and attitude.

On May 28, 1989, while with the Blue Jays, Bell hit a walk-off home run in a 7–5 victory over the Chicago White Sox in the final Major League game played at Exhibition Stadium. Bell also homered in the first game at the Blue Jays' new park, SkyDome (now the Rogers Centre), on June 5, eight days later.

George Bell is enshrined in the upper deck of the Rogers Centre's Level of Excellence, devoted to players and personnel who have made a significant impact as members of the Toronto Blue Jays. He shares the honor with Tony Fernández, Joe Carter, Cito Gaston, Pat Gillick, Dave Stieb, Tom Cheek, Carlos Delgado, Paul Beeston, and Roy Halladay.
 
In 2004, he was inducted into the Caribbean Baseball Hall of Fame. In 2013, he was inducted into the Canadian Baseball Hall of Fame and Ontario Sports Hall of Fame.

Career statistics
In 1587 games over 12 seasons, Bell posted a .278 batting average (1702-for-6123) with 814 runs, 308 doubles, 34 triples, 265 home runs, 1002 RBI, 331 base on balls, .316 on-base percentage and .469 slugging percentage. He recorded a .964 fielding percentage. In the 1985 and '89 ALCS, he hit .271 (13-for-48) with 6 runs, 1 home run and 3 RBI.

Personal life
He is the older brother of late major leaguer Juan Bell.

See also

 List of Toronto Blue Jays home run leaders
 List of Major League Baseball career home run leaders
 List of Major League Baseball players from the Dominican Republic
 List of Major League Baseball career runs batted in leaders
 List of Major League Baseball annual runs batted in leaders

References

External links

1959 births
American League All-Stars
American League Most Valuable Player Award winners
American League RBI champions
Azucareros del Este players
Canadian Baseball Hall of Fame inductees
Chicago Cubs players
Chicago White Sox players
Dominican Republic expatriate baseball players in Canada
Dominican Republic expatriate baseball players in the United States
Dominican Republic people of Cocolo descent
Helena Phillies players
Living people
Major League Baseball left fielders
Major League Baseball players from the Dominican Republic
National League All-Stars
Sportspeople from San Pedro de Macorís
Reading Phillies players
Silver Slugger Award winners
South Bend White Sox players
Spartanburg Phillies players
Syracuse Chiefs players
Tigres del Licey players
Toronto Blue Jays players